Bob Wright (8 January 1943 – 24 October 2019) was an Australian rules footballer who played with North Melbourne in the Victorian Football League (VFL).

Notes

External links 

2019 deaths
1943 births
Australian rules footballers from Victoria (Australia)
North Melbourne Football Club players